Manuel Ricardo Villacorta Orantes (born 29 March 1959) is a Guatemalan  politician, professor and  writer. He served as Guatemala's ambassador to Israel from 1999 to 2000, was also a presidential candidate in 2019, where he placed in seventh place with 5.2% of the vote.

Early and personal life
Villacorta was born on March 29, 1959 in Guatemala City in the bosom of a scholar family. His father Manuel José Villacorta Escobar was an economist, who served as a professor at the Faculty of Economics of the Universidad de San Carlos. His father also served as director of the National Agrarian Bank, Vice Minister and Minister of Economy in the governments of Carlos Arana Osorio and Kjell Laugerud García.

Villacorta graduated with a degree in Political Science from the Universidad de San Carlos de Guatemala, later he studied Social Communication at United Kingdom and a Doctorate in Political Science and Sociology at the Pontifical University of Salamanca.

Political career
Villacorta was proclaimed presidential candidate by a party named Winaq, founded by Nobel Peace Prize laureate Rigoberta Menchú. Liliana Hernández was named his candidate for Vice President.

In June 2019, Villacorta was positioned in the polls with 1.2% in intention to vote, however, after the count in the general elections, he obtained 5.2% of the votes and he was placed in seventh place.

Days after the election, Villacorta broke away from Winaq and announced that he would form a new progressive political party that would participate in the 2023 general elections.

References 

1959 births
Living people
Guatemalan politicians
Guatemalan diplomats
Guatemalan journalists
Male journalists
Guatemalan writers
Guatemalan sociologists
Guatemalan academics
People from Guatemala City
Winaq politicians
Universidad de San Carlos de Guatemala alumni
University of Salamanca alumni
Ambassadors of Guatemala to Israel